The men's 105 kilograms weightlifting event was the seventh men's event at the weightlifting competition, limiting competitors to a maximum of 105 kilograms of body mass. The whole competition took place on August 18, but was divided in two parts due to the number of competitors. Group B weightlifters competed at 15:30, and Group A, at 19:00. This event was the fourteenth Weightlifting event to conclude.

Each lifter performed in both the snatch and clean and jerk lifts, with the final score being the sum of the lifter's best result in each. The athlete received three attempts in each of the two lifts; the score for the lift was the heaviest weight successfully lifted.

Schedule
All times are China Standard Time (UTC+08:00)

Records

Results

 Dmitry Lapikov of Russia originally finished third, but was disqualified after he tested positive for dehydrochlormethyltestosterone.
 Ihor Razoronov of Ukraine originally finished sixth, but was disqualified after he tested positive for nandrolone.

New records

References

 Page 2684

Weightlifting at the 2008 Summer Olympics
Men's events at the 2008 Summer Olympics